Deer Creek Township is one of the fourteen townships of Madison County, Ohio, United States.  The 2000 census found 1,030 people in the township.

Geography
Located in the central part of the county, it borders the following townships:
Monroe Township - north
Jefferson Township - east
Fairfield Township - southeast corner
Union Township - south
Somerford Township - west

Part of the city of London, the county seat of Madison County, is located in Deer Creek Township.

Name and history
As of 1854, the population of the township was 583, 894 in 1890, 882 in 1900, and 883 in 1910.  Statewide, the only other Deer Creek Township is located in Pickaway County.

Government
The township is governed by a three-member board of trustees, who are elected in November of odd-numbered years to a four-year term beginning on the following January 1. Two are elected in the year after the presidential election and one is elected in the year before it. There is also an elected township fiscal officer, who serves a four-year term beginning on April 1 of the year after the election, which is held in November of the year before the presidential election. Vacancies in the fiscal officership or on the board of trustees are filled by the remaining trustees.

References

External links
County website

Townships in Madison County, Ohio
Townships in Ohio